Even is a surname. Notable people with the surname include:

Avraham Even-Shoshan (1906–1984), Russian-Israeli Hebrew linguist and lexicographer
Maya Even (born 1958), Canadian-born British lecturer, journalist and television presenter
Nahshon Even-Chaim (born 1971), first major computer hacker convicted in Australia
Pierre Even (composer) (born 1946), Luxembourgish composer
Pierre Even (producer), Canadian film producer
Shimon Even (1935–2004), Israeli computer science researcher
Uzi Even (born 1940), Israeli professor of chemistry and politician

See also
Even (given name)
Even (disambiguation)